The Huluba is a right tributary of the river Argeșel in Romania. It flows into the Argeșel in Davidești.

References

Rivers of Romania
Rivers of Argeș County